Max Liebermann von Sonnenberg (21 August 1848 – 17 November 1911) was a German officer who became noted as an anti-Semitic politician and publisher. He was part of a wider campaign against German Jews that became a central feature of nationalist politics in Imperial Germany in the late nineteenth century.

Early politics
The foundation of the Christian Social Party by Adolf Stoecker in 1878 helped to galvanise anti-Semitic activity in Germany and brought Liebermann von Sonnenberg, then an officer in the German Imperial Army, to politics. He came to the fore in 1880 when he was central to the organisation of a petition calling for the removal of the Jews from all public positions. The petition attracted as many as 225,000 signatories.

Joining with Bernhard Förster, the brother-in-law of Friedrich Nietzsche, he set up the Deutscher Volksverein (German People's League) in 1881 to support the anti-Semitic agenda. The group struggled for support as it focused on a single issue that spawned a number of movements at the time and it declined further when Förster left for Paraguay in 1886 to set up his ill-fated Nueva Germania project.

Leadership
Following a June 1889 conference of anti-Semites in Bochum Liebermann von Sonnenberg set up his own political party, the Deutsch-Soziale Partei, which became the Deutschsoziale Reformpartei when it merged with Otto Böckel's Deutsche Reformpartei in 1894. Active co-operation had actually started at the 1890 election when a joint list captured five seats in the Reichstag. The two leaders however often found themselves in disagreement as Liebermann von Sonnenberg was basically a conservative whilst Böckel held a more radical world-view beyond his anti-Semitism, including a desire for land reform.

Liebermann von Sonnenberg also undertook anti-Semitic lecture tours although in 1892 he was forced to abandon one such tour after his credibility suffered a blow at the hands of Rabbi Benno Jacob. Delivering a two and a half hour lecture on the Talmud he was confronted at its conclusion by Jacob, bearing a copy of the Talmud and demanding Liebermann von Sonnenberg read out the passages he had referred to in his lecture. When Liebermann von Sonnenberg admitted that he could not read even a letter of the Hebrew language, Jacob chided him for speaking about a book which he could not even read and delivered an impromptu lecture of his own refuting the arguments previously advanced. After this pattern was repeated a few more times Liebermann von Sonnenberg was forced to cancel his tour.

Conservatism
His conservatism proved a problem for Liebermann von Sonnenberg when he purchased the newspaper Antisemitic Correspondence from Theodor Fritsch and promptly lost most of the readership after he dispensed with Fritsch's attacks on leading German figures and organised Christianity. Liebermann von Sonnenberg's only rhetoric in this vein was directed against Germany's Roman Catholic population when he questioned their patriotism by suggesting that every Catholic had "his feet in Germany but his head in Rome".

Reichstag
Liebermann von Sonnenberg was one of the candidates elected and he soon became noted for his attempts to introduce a bill to ban all Jewish immigration during every session of the Reichstag. His 1897 bill that sought to reintroduce denominational oaths in court cases was passed and represented the only occasion when a bill introduced by one of the anti-Semites was successful. He continued to represent his constituency of Fritzlar until his death in 1911.

References

1848 births
1911 deaths
People from Tuchola County
People from the Province of Prussia
German Protestants
German Social Party (German Empire) politicians
German Social Reform Party politicians
Members of the 8th Reichstag of the German Empire
Members of the 9th Reichstag of the German Empire
Members of the 10th Reichstag of the German Empire
Members of the 11th Reichstag of the German Empire
Members of the 12th Reichstag of the German Empire
Prussian Army personnel
German military personnel of the Franco-Prussian War
Burials at the Invalids' Cemetery